Megarritys Bridge is a heritage-listed bridge across the Megarritys Creek, located at Warragamba Dam in the outer south-western Sydney suburb of Warragamba in the Wollondilly Shire local government area of New South Wales, Australia. It was built by Metropolitan Water, Sewerage and Drainage Board. The bridge is also known as Megarritys Bridge. The property is owned by Water NSW, an agency of the Government of New South Wales. It was added to the New South Wales State Heritage Register on 18 November 1999.

History 
Megarritys Creek Bridge is a concrete arch bridge spanning Megarritys Creek. The construction of the bridge provided a vital link across the Creek for the operation of the Warragamba Emergency Scheme. While it was designed eventually to carry the No 1  outlet main from Warragamba Dam, for the Emergency Scheme it carried the  main from the weir to Prospect Reservoir.

Description 
The construction incorporated an arch formwork design using tubular steel scaffolding. It is believed that this was the first instance in NSW of the use of this material for such load carrying purposes.

Modifications and dates 

Heritage listing 
As at 22 March 2001, Megarritys Bridge is considered to be of high significance as it serves the function of carrying the major Warragamba pipeline across Megarritys Creek. It is historically associated with the Warragamba Emergency Scheme, and at the time of construction, was one of the largest concrete arch bridges to be built in NSW. It is a unique item of engineering heritage as its design is based on an innovative "bow string" arch design rather than the more common "decked" arch design.

Megarritys Bridge was listed on the New South Wales State Heritage Register on 18 November 1999 having satisfied the following criteria.

The place possesses uncommon, rare or endangered aspects of the cultural or natural history of New South Wales.

This item is assessed as historically rare statewide. This item is assessed as scientifically rare statewide.

See also 

Historic bridges of New South Wales

References

Bibliography

Attribution

External links

New South Wales State Heritage Register
Warragamba, New South Wales
Bridges in New South Wales
Articles incorporating text from the New South Wales State Heritage Register
Arch bridges in Australia
Concrete bridges in Australia
Viaducts in Australia